Huang Fei (born 13 July 1974) is a Taiwanese Hokkien pop singer.

She is known for folk music, and has won the Golden Melody Award for best Taiwanese female singer twice, in 2011 and 2016.

Selected filmography

Film

References

1974 births
Living people
Taiwanese singer-songwriters
Taiwanese Hokkien pop singers
Musicians from Kaohsiung
20th-century Taiwanese women singers
21st-century Taiwanese women singers